Elizabeth Arden (1884–1966) was a Canadian-American businesswoman.

Elizabeth Arden may also refer to:
Elizabeth Arden, Inc., cosmetics company founded by Elizabeth Arden
Elizabeth Arden Building, historic building in downtown Washington, D.C.
Elizabeth Arden Classic, golf tournament on the LPGA Tour from 1969 to 1986